Ferruginibacter paludis is a Gram-negative, aerobic and rod-shaped  bacterium from the genus of Ferruginibacter which has been isolated from freshwater wetland from Korea.

References

Chitinophagia
Bacteria described in 2015